Orange County Parks, more commonly abbreviated to OC Parks, is a government agency that maintains and oversees the public parks of Orange County, California. The agency operates both natural and manmade parks of the region.

Operations

Wilderness parks
OC Parks manages several wilderness parks:

Urban parks
OC Parks is in charge of many manmade or partially manmade parks in urban settings:

Other operations
OC Parks closed many of their parks to vehicular traffic in March 2020 due to COVID-19 safety concerns. Pedestrians and horseback riders were still permitted to enter the parks. In December 2020, OC Parks was permitted to use sand cubes and boulders to temporarily prevent erosion in Capistrano Beach while looking for a permanent solution.

Public works
OC Parks hosted a virtual Halloween event as well as a series of drive-in movie nights amidst the COVID-19 pandemic in 2020.

References

External Links
 OC Parks website

Parks in Orange County, California
County government agencies in California
County parks departments in the United States
Organizations based in Orange County, California